Lanzhou Radio consists of four radio stations serving Lanzhou and the greater Gansu Province area.

List of Lanzhou radio stations

External links
 Official Website
 Official Website (translated to English with Babelfish)

Chinese-language radio stations
Mandarin-language radio stations
Radio stations in China
Mass media in Lanzhou